Maurice Ordonneau (18 June 1854 – 14 November 1916) was a French dramatist and composer. The son of a merchant of eau de vie, Ordonneau was a prolific author in creating theatrical works. He composed, often with the collaboration of other playwrights, composers and musicians, a great number of operettas, opéra-bouffes, comedies and vaudevilles.

During some months after the death of the playwright Jean Gascogne, Ordonneau was responsible for the drama critic at La Libre Parole

Principal works

1874: Les Rosières de carton, comedy, with Henry Buguet
1876: La Bague de Turlurette, comedy with Ernest Hamm
1876: Les Vacances de Toto, Comédie en vaudevilles, with Victor Bernard
1877: Zigzags dans Versailles, comedy, with Ernest Hamm
1877: Les Cris-Cris de Paris, comedy
1878: Minuit moins cinq !, vaudeville, with Victor Bernard
1879: L'Assommoir pour rire, vaudeville
1880: Théâtre de famille, operetta with Gustave Nadaud, with Eugène Verconsin
1880: Les Deux chambres, operetta
1881: Madame Grégoire, operetta, with Paul Burani
1883: L'Heure du berger, vaudeville
1883: Le Réveil de Vénus, comedy, with Paul Burani, with Henri Cermoise
1883: Les Parisiens en province, comedy with Hippolyte Raymond
1885: L'Ablette, comedy
1885: Les Petites Godin, vaudeville
1885: Mon oncle!, comédie-bouffe, with Paul Burani
1885: Cherchons papa, vaudeville, with Victor Bernard
1886: Serment d'amour, opéra comique, with Edmond Audran
1887: La Princesse Colombine, opéra comique, with Émile André
1887: La Fiancée des verts poteaux, opéra comique, with Edmond Audran
1887: Durand & Durand, vaudeville
1887: Maître Corbeau, comedy, with Hippolyte Raymond
1888: La Poupée, opéra comique after Ernst Theodor Amadeus Hoffmann, with Edmond Audran 
1888: Monsieur Coq-Héron l'avoué, comedy, with Paul Siraudin, with Alfred Delacour, Hippolyte Raymond and Lambert-Thiboust, 
1891: L'oncle Célestin, opérette bouffe, with Edmond Audran and Henri Kéroul
1891: La Petite Poucette, vaudeville-opérette, with Maurice Hennequin and Raoul Pugno
1891: Les Boulinard, operetta
1892: La Femme du commissaire, vaudeville
1892: La Plantation Thomassin, vaudeville, with Albert Vizentini
1893: Mademoiselle ma femme, opéra comique, with Frédéric Toulmouche, libretto cosigned with Octave Pradels 
1893: Madame Suzette, operetta, with André Sylvane and Edmond Audran
1893: Cousin-cousine, operetta, with Henri Kéroul, with Gaston Serpette
1894: La Vertu de Lolotte, comedy
1895: L'Article 214, comedy, with André Sylvane
1895: La Marraine de Charley, comédie-bouffe, with Brandon Thomas
1895: Au coin du feu, operetta
1895: La St-Valentin, opéra comique
1895: La Perle du Cantal, operetta
1895: Le Pèlerinage, comedy, with Maxime Boucheron
1896: La falote, opérette, with Louis Varney and Armand Liorat
1896: Paris quand même ! ou Les deux bigorret, comédie-bouffe, with Ernest Grenet-Dancourt
1897: Niobé, opérette, with Harry Paulton
1897: L'Auberge du Tohu-Bohu, vaudeville-opérette
1899: Les Sœurs Gaudichard, opéra comique
1899: Les Saltimbanques, opérette, with Louis Ganne
1899: Les Sœurs Gaudichard, opéra comique, with Edmond Audran
1899: Le Curé Vincent, operetta
1902: Madame Sherry, operetta, with Hugo Felix
1902: Le Jockey malgré lui, opéra-bouffe, with Paul Gavault
1902: L'Étude Tocasson, vaudeville, with Albin Valabrègue
1903: Le Voyage des Berluron, vaudeville, with Ernest Grenet-Dancourt and Henri Kéroul
1904: Les Hirondelles, operetta, with Henri Hirschmann
1905: Les Filles Jackson et cie, operetta, with Justin Clérice
1905: Une affaire scandaleuse, vaudeville, with Paul Gavault
1910: La D’moiselle du Tabarin, operetta, with André Alexandre
1911: Helda, operetta, with Auguste M. Fechner, Tom de Godement and Michel Farlane
1911: La Marquise de Chicago, operetta
1912: Trois amoureuses, operetta
1913: La Petite Manon, opéra comique, with André Heuzé and Henri Hirschmann
1913: Éva, comédie, with Alfred Maria Willner, with Robert Bodanzky
1913: Le Roi des montagnes, opéra comique
1915: La Cocarde de Mimi-Pinson, operetta, with Henri Goublier
1916: La Demoiselle du printemps'', operetta, with Henri Goublier fils, Francis Gally and Georges Léglise

References

External links
Ouvrages de Maurice Ordonneau
Liste des pièces de Maurice Ordonneau

1854 births
1916 deaths
19th-century classical composers
19th-century French dramatists and playwrights
20th-century French dramatists and playwrights
French Romantic composers
People from Saintes, Charente-Maritime